The 2018–19 FAW Welsh Cup was the 132st season of the annual knockout tournament for competitive football teams in Wales.

First qualifying round

|-
!colspan="3" align="center"|Saturday 8 September

 

|}

Second qualifying round

|-
!colspan="3" align="center"|Saturday 29 September

 

|}

First round

|-
!colspan="3" align="center"|20 October

 

|}

Second round

|-
!colspan="3" align="center"|17 November

 
 
 
 
 
 

 

|}

Third round 

|-
!colspan="3" align="center"|26 January

 
 
 
 
 
 
 
 
 
 

 
 
 
 
|}

Fourth round

|-
!colspan="3" align="center"|26 January

|}

Quarter-finals

|-
!colspan="3" align="center"|1 March

|-
!colspan="3" align="center"|2 March

|}

Semi-finals

|-
!colspan="3" align="center"|30 March

|-
!colspan="3" align="center"|31 March

|}

Final

|-
!colspan="3" align="center"|5 May
		

|}

References

Welsh Cup seasons
Wales
Cup